NGC 6328 is an intermediate spiral galaxy located in the constellation Ara. It is classified as SAB(s)ab in the galaxy morphological classification scheme and was discovered by the British astronomer John Herschel on 2 May 1835. NGC 6328 is located at about 199 million light years away from Earth.

See also 
 List of NGC objects (6001–7000)
 List of NGC objects

References

External links 
 

Intermediate spiral galaxies
Ara (constellation)
6328
60198